The Bianco World Map is a map created by Andrea Bianco, a 15th-century Venetian sailor and cartographer. This map was a part of a nautical atlas including ten pages made of vellum (each measuring 26 × 38 cm). These vellum pages were previously held in an 18th-century binding, but the current owner, Venetian library Biblioteca Marciana, separated the pages for individual exhibition. 

To confirm his authorship of the atlas, Bianco added to the first page a signature flag with the text "Andreas Biancho de Veneciis me fecit M cccc xxx vj". Roughly translated, this reads "Made by me Andreas Biancho in Venice, 1436." 

Andrea Bianco also collaborated with Fra Mauro on the Fra Mauro world map of 1459.

Content
The first page, or Tavola 1, shows a diagram of the Raxon or Toleta of Marteloio, a navigational technique that enabled sailors to calculate how to return to their intended course after being blown off-course. The next eight pages contain seven local and one Europe-wide Portolan charts. The ninth page contains a circular world map measuring 24 cm in circumference. The final page illustrates a Ptolemaic world map based upon Ptolemy's first projection with a graduation of the latitudes. The map also contains two different estimates of the size of the world sphere.

See also
Ancient world maps

Further reading
 "Atlante nautico (1436)".(1993) edited by Piero Falchetta, Arsenale Editrice srl, Venezia.  This book is a special edition for the Banco San Marco and was a limited edition of 1500 copies. The Biblioteca Marciana has made the text and 10 Tavola's available  as ARCHIweb-Risultati Ricerca::Family 029110.

References

Historic maps of the world
1436 works
15th-century maps and globes